"Juliet & Romeo" is a song by French DJ Martin Solveig and Canadian singer-songwriter Roy Woods, released as a single on 6 December 2019 by Virgin EMI Records. The song was written by Martin Solveig, Peter Wade Keusch, Julien Jabre, Rune Reilly Kölsch and Amanda MNDR Warner.

Background
Talking about the song on his YouTube account, Solveig said, "I’m so thrilled to present you ‘Juliet & Romeo’ both the track and the music video. It’s a song that is very special to me, almost like a reminiscence from last summer in Ibiza. Having the talented Roy Woods singing on this one adds a new dimension to it!"

Reception
Katie Bain  of Billboard said, "Shakespeare's teenage lovers may have been doomed, but the French producer and smooth Canadian singer's disco house beat is nothing but funky and upbeat. It's built around a plucky piano sample from Kölsch's “Der Alte,” who remixed Solveig's “My Love” in 2018. For this take, Solveig bumps the pulsing keys with a driving club rhythm and funkalicious vocal chop hook. Woods brings infectious with a playful chorus and layered harmonies. This is one for the dance floor, for sure."

Music video
A music video to accompany the release of "Juliet & Romeo" was first released on YouTube on 6 December 2019. The music video was directed by NDA Paris & Nathanael Day .

Track listing

Charts

Certifications

References

2019 songs
2019 singles
Martin Solveig songs
Roy Woods songs
Songs written by Martin Solveig
Songs written by MNDR
Songs written by Peter Wade Keusch
Songs written by Rune Reilly Kölsch
Virgin EMI Records singles